Madathilparambil Seshan Venkitaraman (26 May 1943 – 8 March 2006) known by his stage name M. S. Thripunithura was an Indian actor who worked in Malayalam film Industry. He was born in Thripunithura in the erstwhile Cochin State. He died in Shoranur due to cardiac arrest while he was on the way to Ernakulam.

Actor

M. S. Thripunithura made his debut in the movie Kadalamma. Thripunithura acted in over 300 Malayalam films including hit films Oru Minnaminunginte Nurunguvettam (1987), Perumthachan (1990), His Highness Abdullah (1990), Santhwanam (1991), Bharatham and Yoddha (1992). As a stage artist, he has won the Kerala State Award for Best Actor for his role in the play, Mochanam.

He was also a Carnatic musician and had interests in Sanskrit and astrology. Thripunithura was also interested in cooking, which he developed from his grandfather, Veeraraghava Iyer, who was the cook for the Maharajah of Cochin.

Personal life

M. S. Thripunithura was married to Bhagyalakshmi and has six daughters Poornima, Pushpa,  Pooja,Raji,Theja,Ananya,Rajkumari. He had a late marriage, marrying at the age of around 45. He died in the early hours of 8 March 2006 after suffering from a cardiac arrest while on a train journey. He was cremated at the premises of his home in Thripunithura in the same evening.

Filmography

 2006 - Shyamam.... Thirumeni
 2005 - Kalyana Kurimanam.... Astrologer
 2004 -  Nirapakittu
 2004 - Natturajavu.... Kurup 
 2004 - Freedom 
 2002 - Kakke Kakke Koodevide 
 2001 - Andolanam 
 2001 - Sundara Purushan....Advocate 
 2001  - Barthavudhyodam... Menon 
 2000 - Mele Valyathe Malakhakuttikal 
 2000 - Kallu Kondoru Pennu 
 2000 - India Gate 
 2000 - Ingane Oru Nila Pakshi 
 2000 - Manassil Oru Manjuthulli
 1999 - Pathram.... Konathiri 
 1999 - Udayapuram Sulthan
 1999 - Vazhunnor... Head Master  
 1999 -   Crime File.... Namasivaya Swami
 1998 - Kalaapam.... Krishnanunni Mashu
 1997 -  Gajaraja Manthram...  Ananthan's Uncle 
 1997 -  Manasam  ... Rajalakshmni's Father   
 1997 -  Junior Mandrake... Astrologer
 1996 - April 19 
 1996 -  Lalanam
 1996 - Devaragam 
 1995 -  Sreeragam .... Harihara Iyer 
 1995 -  Thirumanassu ... Achutha Kurup 
 1995 - Achan Kombathu Amma Varambathu 
 1995 -  Vrudhanmare Sookshikkuka ... Warrier 
 1995 -  Aksharam.... Kunjikrishna Pothuwal
 1995 -  Special Squad.... Vasudevan Nair 
 1995 -  Aniyan Bava Chetan Bava... College Professor  
 1994 -  Bheesmacharya 
 1994 -  Kudumba Visesham 
 1994 -  Gamanam..... Ananthapadhmanabha Iyyer 
 1993 -  Sakshal Sreeman Chathunni...Kalpana's Father
 1993 -  Dhruvam ... Poovathil Kunjikannan 
 1993 -  Pravachakan... Chief Minister 
 1993 -  Venkalam... Damodaran Nampoothiri   
 1992 - Yodha ..... Kutti Mama (Madhubala Father )
 1991 - Inspector Balram ... Krishna Pillai 
 1991 - Saanthwanam 
 1991 -  Cheppu Kilukkunna Changathi .... Chidambara Krishna Iyer 
 1991 -   Ennathe Programme .... Indu's Father 
 1990 - His Highness Abdulla .... Nampoothiri 
 1990 - Orukkam ..... Koyikal Madhava Kurup 
 1990 -  Nagarangalil Chennu Raparkam 
 1990 -  Parampara ... Meera's Father
 1990 -  Iyyer The Great
 1990 -  Randam Varavu .... Ramanuja Iyer 
 1990 -  Veena Meettiya Vilangukal 
 1989 -  Carnivel
 1989 -  Jagratha .... Kurup 
 1989 -  Chanakyan .... Geethu's Father 
 1989 -  Dasharatham ... Adv. Govindan 
 1989 -   Naaduvazhikal ... M.L.A 
 1988 - Puravrutham 
 1988 -  Nineteen Twenty One
 1988 -   Kakkothi Kaavile Appoppan Thaadikal ... Valsala's Father 
 1988 - Munnam Mura .... Nampoothiri 
 1987 -  Oridathu.... Nampoothirippadu 
 1987 - Oru Minnaminuginte Nurugu Vettam ..... Bhadran Nampoothiripadu 
 1984 - Swanthamevide Bandamevide .... Indulekha's Father
 1983 - Sandhya Vandanam ... Marar 
 1979 -  Agnivyooham
 1979 -  Ankakkuri

Television serials
 Manasi (Doordarshan)
Kavyanjali (Surya TV)
Thaali (Surya TV)
Sthree (Asianet)
Melappadam (Doordarshan)
Kairalivilasam lodge (Doordarshan)
Kadamattath kathanar (Asianet)

References

External links 

M S Thrippoonithura at MSI

Male actors from Kochi
1941 births
2006 deaths
Male actors in Malayalam cinema
Indian male film actors
20th-century Indian male actors
21st-century Indian male actors
Indian male television actors
Male actors in Hindi television